The 1992 season is the 70th season of competitive football in Ecuador.

National leagues

Serie A
Champion: El Nacional (10th title)
International cup qualifiers:
1993 Copa Libertadores: El Nacional, Barcelona
1993 Copa CONMEBOL: Emelec
Relegated: Universidad Católica (after the first stage); LDU Portoviejo (after the second stage)

Serie B
Winner:
First Stage: LDU Portoviejo (4th title)
Second Stage: Santos (1st title)
Promoted: LDU Portoviejo (after the first stage); Santos (after the second stage)
Relegated: Juvenil, Macará

Segunda
Winner: Audaz Octubrino (1st title)
Promoted: Audaz Octubrino, 9 de Octubre

National team

Senior team
The Ecuador national team played five friendlies in 1992.

Note: This is an unofficial friendly.

External links
 National leagues details on RSSSF

 
1992